David Rowley is an English writer specializing in the Beatles music.

He is the author of Beatles For Sale, Help!: 50 Songwriting, Recording and Career Tips Used by the Beatles, and All Together Now: The ABC of The Beatles Songs and Albums.

References

English writers about music
Living people
Year of birth missing (living people)